EHC Olten is a Swiss professional ice hockey team based in Olten, Switzerland. It plays in the Swiss League, the second tier ice hockey league in Switzerland. It has claimed two Swiss League Championships, gaining promotion to the National League in 1985, 1988 and 1993.

Honors
National League B Championships: (2) 1981, 1988

References

External links
EHC Olten official website

Ice hockey teams in Switzerland
Canton of Solothurn
Olten